Carl Bleakley Willis (24 March 1893 – 12 May 1930) was an Australian sportsman who played Australian rules football with South Melbourne and University in the Victorian Football League (VFL) as well as first-class cricket for Victoria.

Family
The son of Thomas Rupert Henry Willis (1860-1933), and Mary Wilson Willis (1867-1949), née Bleakley, Carl Bleakley Willis was born at Daylesford, Victoria on 24 March 1893.

Education
Willis was educated at Wesley College, Melbourne, and the University of Melbourne, graduating with a Bachelor of Dental Science (BDSc) in December 1915.

Football

University (VFL)
He was a regular player for University in 1912, his first season.

Tribunal
He was suspended for four weeks after being reported by a steward for punching Fred Hanson in the match against St Kilda, at the M.C.G. on 18 May 1912.

It was the first time in VFL history that a player had been suspended by a steward; and Willis was the only University player to be suspended during the club's VFL existence.

South Melbourne (VFL)
He was cleared from University to South Melbourne in the 1915 pre-season.

He captained South Melbourne in the 1921 season.

Pioneer Exhibition Game" (London, October 1916)
He played for the (winning) Third Australian Divisional team in the famous "Pioneer Exhibition Game" of Australian Rules football, held in London, on Saturday, 28 October 1916. A news film was taken at the match.

Military service
He enlisted in November 1915 and served as a dentist with the Australian Army Medical Corps Dental Detail.

He served if France in late 1916, but was gassed, hospitalised and returned to England, taking charge of a dental unit on Salisbury Plain. He rose to the rank of captain in July 1918.

Cricket
His cricket career, which began in 1913–14, continued after he retired as a footballer. Willis represented the Australian Imperial Forces team in 1918 and 1919, and Victoria from 1914 to 1928. He was selected to tour New Zealand in 1920–21 with the Australian team but was unavailable.

Dentist
He practised dentistry in the Melbourne suburb of Malvern until 1929, when he moved to Numurkah in northern Victoria and then to Tocumwal in New South Wales.

Death
He died of pneumonia on 12 May 1930 in Berrigan, New South Wales, and was buried at the Melbourne General Cemetery on 14 May 1930.

See also
 List of Victoria first-class cricketers
 1916 Pioneer Exhibition Game

Footnotes

References
 Photographs at third from left, middle row, at :File:Melbourne_University%27s_Inter-Varsity_Team_(Adelaide_1914).tiff, Group portrait of members of the AIF Cricket Eleven (D00685), collection of the Australian War Memorial, The (Melbourne) Herald, (Saturday, 10 January 1920), p.2, and Table Talk, (Thursday, 15 January 1920), p.15.
 Football Riot: An Angry Crowd: M.C.C. Ground Rushed: Player Reported, The Argus, (Monday, 9 August 1915), p. 8.
 Pioneer Exhibition Game Australian Football: in aid of British and French Red Cross Societies: 3rd Australian Division v. Australian Training Units at Queen's Club, West Kensington, on Saturday, October 28th, 1916, at 3pm, Wightman & Co., (London), 1919.
 Growden, G. (2019) Cricketers at War, ABC Books: Sydney. 
 Holmesby, R. & Main, J. (2007) The Encyclopedia of AFL Footballers. 7th ed. Melbourne: Bas Publishing. .
 Richardson, N. (2016) The Game of Their Lives, Pan Macmillan Australia: Sydney. 
 A.I.F. Cricketer's death, The (Lismore) Northern Star, (Saturday, 11 May 1930), p.6.
 First World War Embarkation Roll: Lance-Corporal Carl Bleackley Willis (346), collection of the Australian War Memorial.
 First World War Nominal Roll: Captain Carl Bleackley Willis, collection of the Australian War Memorial.
 First World War Service Record: Captain Carl Bleackley Willis, National Archives of Australia.

External links

 
 
 Cricinfo biography

1893 births
1930 deaths
People educated at Wesley College (Victoria)
Australian rules footballers from Victoria (Australia)
Australian Rules footballers: place kick exponents
University Football Club players
Participants in "Pioneer Exhibition Game" (London, 28 October 1916)
Sydney Swans players
Australian cricketers
Victoria cricketers
Australian dentists
Australian military personnel of World War I
Australian Imperial Force Touring XI cricketers
People from Daylesford, Victoria
20th-century dentists